Henry Albert Polic II (February 20, 1945 – August 11, 2013) was an American stage, screen, and voice actor, best known as Jerry Silver on Webster.

He earned his Master of Fine Arts degree from Florida State University and later served in the military police at Fort Riley in Kansas. While at Florida State University he starred in many stage productions including Our Town. He also was an active member of Tau Kappa Epsilon fraternity. In 1975, Polic was a regular cast member on Mel Brooks' short-lived television comedy, When Things Were Rotten. Polic also had a regular role as Dracula in Monster Squad (1976).

In the 1980s, Polic was often seen as a celebrity guest player on various game shows. His most frequent guest spots were on the various incarnations of Pyramid, as he appeared multiple times on The $25,000 Pyramid and the editions of The $100,000 Pyramid hosted by Dick Clark and John Davidson for producer Bob Stewart. Polic did various other work for Stewart, hosting the game show Double Talk in 1986, a pilot for a revival of Stewart's Eye Guess called Eye Q in 1988, and sharing announcing duties with Johnny Gilbert and Dean Goss on the latter edition of The $100,000 Pyramid. His specialties included foreign and regional accents, ballroom dancing and baritone singing.

From the early 1990s until his death, Polic was perhaps best known as the original British-accented voice of the Scarecrow in Batman: The Animated Series. Originally he had a deep, gruff voice, but later made his voice a bit higher for the role. Polic also worked at Florida State University as a guest star in the School of Theatre's production of A Christmas Carol, playing Ebenezer Scrooge in 1996.

Polic died on August 11, 2013, of cancer. A US Army Vietnam veteran, he is interred at National Memorial Cemetery of Arizona in Phoenix.

Filmography

Film

Television

References

External links
 
 

1945 births
2013 deaths
Male actors from Pittsburgh
American male film actors
American game show hosts
American male stage actors
American male television actors
American male voice actors
Deaths from cancer in California
Burials in Arizona
Florida State University alumni
20th-century American male actors